NUD may stand for:

 En Nahud Airport's IATA airport code
 Neighbor unreachability detection, a functionality of the Neighbor Discovery Protocol
 Niue dollar